The Civil Aviation Authority (QCAA) is an agency of the government of Qatar. Its head office is in Doha. It was established in year 2001. Hamad International Airport in Qatar was developed under the supervision of Civil Aviation Authority (Qatar).

References

External links

 

Civil aviation in Qatar
Qatar
Government agencies of Qatar
Transport organisations based in Qatar